This article is about the American Billboard Hot 100 chart held from 1958 to 1969.

The Billboard Hot 100 chart is the main song chart of the American music industry and is updated every week by the Billboard magazine. During 1958–1969 the chart was based collectively on each single's weekly physical sales figures and airplay on American radio stations.

Number ones 
Key
 – Number-one single of the year

Note: The year-end number-one singles for 1963, 1965 and 1966 were "Surfin' U.S.A." by The Beach Boys, "Wooly Bully" by Sam the Sham & the Pharaohs, and "California Dreamin'" by The Mamas and the Papas, respectively, which peaked at numbers 3, 2, and 4, also respectively, and thus are not included here.

Notes
Across two separate chart runs (1960, 1962), "The Twist" has accumulated three total weeks at number-one. It was the only song in the history of the Hot 100 to achieve number-one in two separate chart runs, until "All I Want for Christmas Is You" by Mariah Carey accomplished the same feat in 2020.

Statistics by decade

By artist 
The following artists achieved four or more number-one hits during 1958–1969. A number of artists had number-one singles on their own as well as part of a collaboration.

Artists by total number of weeks at number-one 
The following artists were featured in top of the chart for the highest total number of weeks during 1958–1969.

Songs by total number of weeks at number-one 
The following songs were featured in top of the chart for the highest total number of weeks during 1958–1969.

See also
 List of UK Singles Chart number ones of the 1960s
 List of Billboard number-one singles
 1960s in music

References

United States Hot 100
 1958-1969